Alex Colman (born 22 July 1998) is a Belgian racing cyclist, who currently rides for UCI ProTeam .

Major results
2017
 8th Kernen Omloop Echt-Susteren
2018
 1st Stage 1 Okolo Jižních Čech (TTT)
 4th De Kustpijl
 6th Eschborn–Frankfurt Under–23
 6th Dorpenomloop Rucphen

References

External links

1998 births
Living people
Belgian male cyclists
Sportspeople from Sint-Niklaas
Cyclists from East Flanders
Cyclo-cross cyclists
21st-century Belgian people